Fish stocks are subpopulations of a particular species of fish, for which intrinsic  parameters (growth, recruitment, mortality and fishing mortality) are traditionally regarded as the significant factors determining the stock's population dynamics, while extrinsic factors (immigration and emigration) are traditionally ignored.

Concepts

The stock concept 
All species have geographic limits to their distribution, which are determined by their tolerance to environmental conditions, and their ability to compete successfully with other species. In marine environments this may be less evident than on land because there are fewer topographical boundaries, however, discontinuities still exist, produced for example by mesoscale and sub-mesoscale circulations that minimize long-distance dispersal of fish larvae.

For fish, it is rare for an individual to reproduce randomly with all other individuals of that species within its biological range. There is a tendency to form a structured series of discrete populations which have a degree of reproductive isolation from each other in space, in time, or in both. This isolation is reflected in the development between sub-populations of genetic differences, morphological variations and exposure to different chemical regimes and parasitic species. Sub-populations also respond to fishing in such a way that fishing on one population appears to have no effect on the population dynamics of a neighbouring population.

The currently accepted definition of a stock in fisheries science, is that of Begg et al. (1999), “…[a “stock”] describes characteristics of semi-discrete groups of fish with some definable attributes which are of interest to fishery managers.”  

Stock identification is a field of fisheries science which aims to identify these subpopulations, based on a number of techniques.This concept is applied in sustainable development goal14 where target 14.4 is measured a fish stock sustainability indicator 14.4.1.

Straddling stock 

The United Nations defines straddling stocks as "stocks of fish such as pollock, which migrate between, or occur in both, the economic exclusion zone (EEZ) of one or more states and the high seas". Sovereign responsibility must be worked out in collaboration with neighbouring coastal states and fishing entities. Usually this is done through the medium of an intergovernmental regional organisation set up for the purpose of coordinating the management of that stock.

Straddling stocks are usually pelagic, rather than demersal. Demersal species move less than pelagic species, since they tend to relate to bottom topography. Pelagic species are more mobile, their movements influenced by ocean temperatures and the availability of zooplankton as food. Example pelagic fish are capelin, herring, whiting, mackerel and redfish, There are, however, a few demersal species that are straddling, such as the Greenland halibut migrates in feeding/spawning migrations to Greenland in the west and to the Faeroes in the east.

Straddling stock can be compared with transboundary stock. Straddling stock range both within an EEZ as well as in the high seas. Transboundary stock range in the EEZs of at least two countries. A stock can be both transboundary and straddling.

Assessment

In fisheries science and ecology, stock assessment is an important tool in fisheries management.

In particular, to ensure continued, healthy, fish stocks, measurements of the Spawning Stock Biomass (the stock population capable of reproducing) allows sensible conservation strategies to be developed and maintained through the application of sustainable fishing quotas.

The World Wildlife Fund and the Zoological Society of London jointly issued their "Living Blue Planet Report" on 16 September 2015 which states that there was a dramatic fall of 74% in world-wide stocks of the important scombridae fish such as mackerel, tuna and bonitos between 1970 and 2010, and the global overall "population sizes of mammals, birds, reptiles, amphibians and fish fell by half on average in just 40 years." It is hoped that global efforts like the United Nations Sustainable Development Goal 14 meets its targets aimed at reversing these trends.

Fluctuations

The stocks for individual marine species can "boom and bust" in linked and compensatory ways. For example, in billfish longline fisheries, the Atlantic catch of blue marlin declined in the 1960s. This was accompanied by an increase in sailfish catch. The sailfish catch then declined from the end of the 1970s to the end of the 1980s, compensated by an increase in swordfish catch. As a result, the overall billfish catch remained fairly stable. At Georges Bank, a decline in cod during the 1960s was accompanied by a rise in flatfish, and more recently, with the collapse of the predatory Atlantic cod, lobster catches in Maine have boomed.

See also 
 List of harvested aquatic animals by weight
 Overfishing

References

Further reading
 Begg GA, Friedland KD and Pearce JB (1999) "Stock identification and its role in stock assessment and fisheries management: an overview." Fisheries Research, 43:1–8.
 Booke HE (1999) "The stock concept revisited: perspectives on its history in fisheries" Fisheries Research, 43 (1–3): 9–11. 
 Cadrin SX, Friedland KD and Waldman JR (2004) Stock Identification Methods : Applications in Fishery Science. 
 Pintassilgo, P and Lindroos, M "Management of Straddling Fish Stocks: A Bioeconomic Approach" In: Encyclopedia of Life Support Systems – Volume 5, UNESCO.

External links
Identification of stocks of horse macekerel, Trachurus trachurus
Identification of stocks of herring, Clupea harengus
FAO Fisheries Department and its SOFIA report addressing fish stocks

Fisheries science